Ivaylo Klimentov (born 3 February 1998) is a Bulgarian footballer who plays as a midfielder for Spartak Varna.

Career

Ludogorets Razgrad
Klimentov joined Ludogorets Razgrad in 2014 after arriving from the Spanish Gimnàstic de Tarragona.

He made his debut for Ludogorets II on 17 March 2016. 2 months later on 27 May 2016 in a match against Botev Plovdiv he also made his debut for Ludogorets' main team. Klimentov started the 2017–18 season at Ludogorets II by scoring his debut goal for the team in the first match of the season against Lokomotiv 1929 Sofia.

He scored his first goal for Ludogorets on 20 May 2018 in the last league match for the season against Botev Plovdiv and later was nominated as Man of the match.

On 6 July 2018, Klimentov was loaned to Vitosha Bistritsa until the end of the season.

Spartak Varna
In July 2022 Klimentov joined Spartak Varna on a two-year contract.

International career

Youth levels
Klimentov was called up for the Bulgaria U19 team for the 2017 European Under-19 Championship qualification from 22 to 27 March 2017. After a draw and 2 wins the team qualified for the knockout phase which was held in July 2017.

Career statistics

Club

Honours

Club

Ludogorets
First Professional Football League (3): 2015–16, 2016–17, 2017-18

CSKA 1948
Second Professional Football League (1): 2019–20

References

External links
 

1998 births
Living people
People from Pazardzhik Province
Bulgarian footballers
Bulgaria youth international footballers
PFC Ludogorets Razgrad II players
PFC Ludogorets Razgrad players
FC Vitosha Bistritsa players
FC CSKA 1948 Sofia players
PFC Spartak Varna players
First Professional Football League (Bulgaria) players
Second Professional Football League (Bulgaria) players
Association football midfielders